Margaret Court defeated Ann Jones in the final, 6–1, 4–6, 6–3 to win the women's singles tennis title at the 1969 French Open. It was her third French Open title, her second major title of the year, and her fifteenth major overall.

Nancy Richey was the defending champion, but lost in the semifinals to Court.

Seeds
The seeded players are listed below. Margaret Court is the champion; others show the round in which they were eliminated.

 Margaret Court (champion)
 Billie Jean King (quarterfinals)
 Ann Jones (finalist)
 Nancy Richey (semifinals)
 Julie Heldman (quarterfinals)
 Virginia Wade (second round)
 Françoise Dürr (third round)
 Kerry Melville (quarterfinals)

Qualifying

Draw

Key
 Q = Qualifier
 WC = Wild card
 LL = Lucky loser
 r = Retired

Finals

Earlier rounds

Section 1

Section 2

Section 3

Section 4

References

External links
1969 French Open – Women's draws and results at the International Tennis Federation

Women's Singles
French Open by year – Women's singles
1969 in women's tennis
1969 in French women's sport
French